Ocnogyna corsicum is a moth of the family Erebidae. It was described by Jules Pierre Rambur in 1832. It is found on Corsica and Sardinia. The habitat consists of grasslands, pastures, maquis, forest edges and mountain slopes.

The females are brachypterous.

The larvae are polyphagous and have been recorded feeding on various plants, including Genista, Urtica, Trifolium, Taraxacum, Plantago and Gramineae species. Larvae can be found from April to June.

Subspecies
Ocnogyna corsicum corsica (Corsica)
Ocnogyna corsicum sardoa Staudinger, 1870 (Sardinia)

Gallery

References

External links

Ocnogyna corsica on Fauna Europaea

Spilosomina
Moths described in 1832
Moths of Europe
Taxa named by Jules Pierre Rambur